Severe Tropical Cyclone Nina was a significant tropical cyclone, which impacted six island nations and caused several deaths. The system was first noted as a tropical low over the Cape York Peninsula on December 21. Over the next few days the system moved south-westwards and moved into the Gulf of Carpentaria where it was named Nina, after it had developed into a tropical cyclone during December 23. The system was subsequently steered south-eastwards by an upper level trough of low pressure, before it made landfall as a Category 2 tropical cyclone on the Cape York Peninsula near Cape Keerweer during December 25. Over land the system weakened into a tropical low before it regenerated into a tropical cyclone over the Coral Sea during December 28. The system subsequently moved north-eastwards, under the influence of Severe Tropical Cyclone Kina and an upper level ridge of high pressure. During January 1, 1993, Nina peaked with sustained wind speeds of 140 km/h (85 mph), as it affected Rennell, Bellona and Temotu provinces in the Solomon Islands. The system subsequently gradually weakened as it accelerated eastwards and affected Rotuma, Wallis and Futuna, Tonga and Niue. Nina was subsequently absorbed by Kina, while both systems were located near the Southern Cook Islands during January 5.

Meteorological history

During the middle of December 1992, an active phase of the Madden–Julian oscillation took place which helped to reinforce atmospheric convection across Northern Australia and the western Pacific Ocean. A tropical low subsequently developed within this area of atmospheric convection and moved south-westwards into the warm waters of the Gulf of Carpentaria during December 22. During the following day, the United States Joint Typhoon Warning Center initiated advisories on the low and designated it as Tropical Cyclone 03P before the Australian Bureau of Meteorology named the system: Nina, after it had developed into a Category 1 tropical cyclone on the Australian tropical cyclone intensity scale.

Over the next day the system continued to intensify before both the JTWC and the BoM reported that Nina had peaked with winds of 100 km/h (65 mph) during December 25, which made it a category 2 tropical cyclone on the Australian scale. The system subsequently made landfall on the Cape York Peninsula during that day near Cape Keerweer, where it weakened into a tropical low and emerged into the Coral Sea during December 27.

The system re-intensified into a tropical cyclone during December 28, as it moved north-eastwards, under the influence of Severe Tropical Cyclone Kina and an upper level ridge of high pressure. Over the next few days, the system continued to re-intensify as it moved north-eastwards, before both the JTWC and the BoM reported that Nina had peaked with winds of 140 km/h (85 mph). This made it a Category 3 severe tropical cyclone on the Australian scale and equivalent to a category 1 hurricane on the Saffir–Simpson hurricane wind scale. During January 1, Nina passed over Rennell Island at its peak intensity, as it moved into the South Pacific basin. Over the next few days, the system gradually weakened, as it accelerated eastwards through Temotu Province and around the eastern side of Kina. During January 3, Nina passed to the north of the Fijian dependency of Rotuma, before it passed in between the islands of Wallis and Futuna. During the next day the system weakened into a tropical low, as it turned south-eastwards and passed in between Tonga and Niue, before it was absorbed into Kina's circulation, while both systems were located near the Southern Cook Islands during January 5.

Preparations and impact
Severe Tropical Cyclone Nina impacted the Gulf of Carpentaria, the Cape York Peninsula, Niue, Rotuma, Tonga, Tuvalu, the Solomon Islands, Wallis and Futuna. Due to the impact of this system, the name Nina was subsequently retired, from the list of names for the Australian region by the World Meteorological Organization.

Gulf of Carpentaria
As Nina developed in the Gulf of Carpentaria, tropical cyclone watches and warnings were issued, for parts of the Northern Territory and Queensland. These areas included Nhulunbuy in the Northern Territory, Mapoon, Aurukun and the Lockhart River in Queensland. The system subsequently moved eastwards and affected sparsely populated and uninhabited areas of the Cape York Peninsula, where torrential rainfall was recorded during December 25. As a result of Nina impacting Queensland, the State Disaster Coordination Centre in Brisbane operated around the clock, while SES units, local authorities and disaster district coordinators in the region were put on full alert. Ahead of the system affecting Port Stewart, ten members of a twenty-member fishing party were evacuated to safety while the other ten refused to be evacuated. As a result, they were left stranded at the port, by the swollen Stewart River and its flooded tributaries until a rescue helicopter rescued them. Within the Aurukun Aboriginal community and Pormpuraaw widespread damage to trees were reported, while four houses were damaged by flying tree branches.

Solomon Islands
After impacting Queensland, Nina impacted the Solomon Islands between December 30 and January 3, where it caused extensive damage to southern and eastern islands including Rennell and Bellona. Islanders were caught almost unprepared for Nina, because of preparations for the traditional New Year Celebrations. There were 3 people killed in the islands with an elderly woman killed on Bellona after she was trapped under a collapsed house while twins born at the height also died from lack of warm dry linen and shelter. The only buildings left standing were the Australian built Seventh Day Adventist churches in these islands.

The Solomon Islands Government declared parts of Rennell and Bellona, Southern Guadalcanal, Temotu, Makira and Malaita Provinces disaster areas. The Government subsequently shipped and airlifted relief materials to the affected areas, including food supplies, medical supplies, tarpaulins and water. The Solomon Islands Red Cross also helped with the relief effort and dispatched 113 tarpaulins to four provinces to shelter the homeless, along with blankets, clothing and various household items. They used reserve funds in order to transport these supplies to the islands affected by canoe and plane. The Government of the Solomon Islands subsequently launched an appeal for international assistance, with food assistance, tapualins, tents, water containeds and chainsaws amongst the things asked for. A need also existed for helicopters and aircraft services, in order for field assessments to take place and the transportation of water engineers.

Rotuma, Wallis and Futuna, Samoa and Tonga
However, the system only had a minimal effect on Rotuma, with a few rain showers and sustained winds of  occurring for a brief period. In conjunction with Kina, Nina affected Wallis and Futuna between January 3–4, however, there were no tropical cyclone warnings were issued for the French Territory by the FMS. Within the islands some damage to crops and houses was reported.

Ahead of Nina affecting the Samoan Islands, residents living near the sea were warned to move inland, while ships were ordered to remain in port. Some minor damage to roofs, bananas and breadfruit was reported, while total damages in American Samoa to both property and crops were estimated at between $ and $.

Nina affected Northern Tonga during January 4, just after Kina had affected Tonga's southern islands with hurricane-force winds. Ahead of Nina affecting the islands, a gale warning was issued for the islands of Niuafo'ou and Keppel, where some damage to houses and crops were recorded. A gale warning was also issued for the island nation of Niue during January 4, where winds of up to  caused damage to the island nations port.

Tuvalu
After Severe Tropical Cyclone Joni had affected Tuvalu during the previous month, Nina and Kina indirectly impacted the island nation during the opening days of January 1993. The systems contributed to the strength of the westerly winds that were already present over the islands, with winds of up to  reported throughout the islands. As a result, damage was reported to crops and several buildings in the island nation, including thirty houses. The Vaitupu Fisheries Harbour, that had only just been built during 1992, was seriously damaged by waves attributed to the two cyclones.

On the island of Nanumea, a poorly designed sea wall trapped the storm surge on the island, which caused salt water contamination of the island vegetation and killed several trees. The An appeal for international assistance was subsequently made by the Government of Tuvalu, as supplied of food and other essentials like petrol and kerosene on the worst affected islands were running low. The European Commission also provided emergency aid to Tuvalu which enabled the Red Cross, to provide foodstuffs, shelter, medical supplies and utensils to people whose homes were destroyed.

See also
Cyclone Evan

References

External links

Category 4 Australian region cyclones
Category 4 South Pacific cyclones
Tropical cyclones in Tuvalu
Retired Australian region cyclones
Tropical cyclones in Wallis and Futuna
Tropical cyclones in Tonga
Tropical cyclones in Queensland
1992–93 Australian region cyclone season
1992–93 South Pacific cyclone season
Tropical cyclones in the Solomon Islands